Don't Turn Away is the first album by the American punk rock band Face to Face. It was released in 1992 under the label Dr. Strange Records, and was considered a strong debut for the band. It was re-released a year later on Fat Wreck Chords.

Two years later, "Disconnected," the album's third track, was re-recorded for the band's second album Big Choice. Their then-label A&M Records wanted the band to re-record it, because no one could "hear a single" until the L.A. radio station KROQ first played it.

Critical reception
Trouser Press called the album "a stirring and exciting debut undercut only slightly by its overt stylistic debt to Hüsker Dü and Social Distortion."

Track listing
All songs by Keith, Riddle

"You've Done Nothing" – 1:59
"I'm Not Afraid" – 2:44
"Disconnected" – 3:27
"No Authority" – 2:42
"I Want" – 3:00
"You've Got a Problem" – 2:47
"Everything Is Everything" – 3:08
"I'm Trying" – 2:52
"Pastel" – 3:13
"Nothing New" – 3:26
"Walk Away" – 2:09
"Do You Care?" – 3:01
"1,000 X" – 2:32

Fat Wreck Chords bonus tracks (2016) 
<li> "Who You Are" – 1:56
<li> "Don’t Turn Away" – 2:47

Personnel
Face To Face - producer
Trever Keith - guitar, vocals
Matt Riddle - bass, Backup vocals
Rob Kurth - drums

Technical personnel 

Jim Goodwin - engineer
Donnell Cameron - engineer
John Golden - mastering
Mike Brooling - sequencing

Charts
Singles - Billboard (United States)

References

1992 debut albums
Face to Face (punk band) albums
Dr. Strange Records albums